Studies in Educational Evaluation is a quarterly peer-reviewed academic journal covering evaluation research in the field of education. It was established in 1975 and is published by Elsevier. The editor-in-chief is P. Van Petegem (University of Antwerp). According to the Journal Citation Reports, the journal has a 2019 impact factor of 1.983.

References

External links

Education journals
Elsevier academic journals
Publications established in 1975
English-language journals
Quarterly journals